The Greater Columbus Arts Council (GCAC) is an arts organization in Columbus, Ohio. The council funds artists and organizations in Central Ohio, and hosts the annual Columbus Arts Festival.

Building
The Greater Columbus Arts Council office is the former Winders Motor Sales Company, a historic building in Downtown Columbus. It was listed on the National Register of Historic Places in 2019. The building is one of few early car dealerships remaining in downtown Columbus.

The building was constructed in 1916 during a period of commercial development downtown. The building became an early dealership in the city, and an early commercial business as manufacturing work became less common downtown. In later decades, the building was used in numerous ways, including as a tire store and as a plumbing supply shop. In 2020, the Greater Columbus Arts Council moved from its offices in the Chase Tower into the Winder Motor Sales building. The move increases the council's space, gives it street-level space, and will permit open office hours. The building is owned by Connect Realty, which sought the building's historic listings for tax credits in refurbishing it at a cost of $1.6 million. The realty company owns the adjacent Standard Building, which it has separately listed on historic registers to make restoration more affordable.

The Greater Columbus Arts Council opened its public gallery and first exhibition in the building in July 2020.

See also
 National Register of Historic Places listings in Columbus, Ohio

References

External links
 

Commercial buildings on the National Register of Historic Places in Ohio
Neoclassical architecture in Ohio
Commercial buildings completed in 1916
Buildings in downtown Columbus, Ohio
National Register of Historic Places in Columbus, Ohio
Columbus Register properties